Elk Creek is a tributary, about  long, of the Umpqua River in the U.S. state of Oregon.
The creek begins near Ben More Mountain in the lower Cascade Range south of Elkhead and flows generally north until passing under Interstate 5 in Scotts Valley. It then turns sharply west, flowing through the small city of Drain before meeting the Umpqua at Elkton. Oregon Route 99 runs along the creek for a short distance south of Drain, and Oregon Route 38 follows the creek from Drain to Elkton.

Robert Lancaster built the bridge in 1929 to provide road access to his farm. Added to the National Register of Historic Places in 1979, the bridge was delisted after its destruction in 1995.

Tributaries
Named tributaries of Elk Creek from source to mouth are Shingle Mill, Walker, Adams, Bennet, Cox, Salt, and Wehmeyer creeks followed by Dodge Canyon. Then come Asker, McClintock, Wise, Yoncalla, Pass, Post, and Billy creeks. Further downstream are Hardscrabble, Jack, Parker, Lancaster, Indian, and Brush creeks. Entering the lower reaches are Big Tom Folley, Hancock, and Little Tom Folley creeks.

See also
 List of rivers of Oregon

References

External links
Elk Creek Watershed Council

Rivers of Oregon
Rivers of Douglas County, Oregon